Badaling is the site of the most visited section of the Great Wall of China, approximately  northwest of Beijing's city center, in Badaling Town, Yanqing District (within Beijing municipality). The portion of the wall running through the site was built in 1504 during the Ming Dynasty, along with a military outpost reflecting the location's strategic importance.

Badaling Great Wall was built in the Ming Dynasty (1505) to occupy a commanding and strategic position for protecting the Juyongguan Pass (Juyongguan section of the Great Wall) to its south, further protecting the city of Beijing.

The portion of the wall at Badaling has undergone restoration, and in 1957, it was the first section of the wall to open to tourism.  Now visited annually by millions, the immediate area has seen significant development, including hotels, restaurants, and a cable car.

Transport

Expressway
The Badaling Expressway connects Badaling with central Beijing.

Railway
Two China Railway lines serve Badaling:

The Beijing-Zhangjiakou intercity railway has CRH high-speed trains running from Beijing North Station, stopping at the underground Badaling Great Wall Station.
Line S2 of the Beijing Suburban Railway serves people who want to go to the at-grade Badaling Station from Huangtudian Station.

Bus
The 877 bus runs frequently between Deshengmen Bus Station (adjacent to the Jishuitan Station on Line 2 and Line 19 of Beijing Subway) and Badaling.

Fame
It was here that President Richard Nixon and his wife, accompanied by Vice Premier Li Xiannian, visited on February 24, 1972, during his historic journey to China.  Many other world leaders have made a trip to the site including Margaret Thatcher, Ronald Reagan and Mikhail Gorbachev.

Badaling and the expressway were the site of the finishing circuit of the Urban Road Cycling Course in the 2008 Summer Olympics. Laps of the circuit passed through gates in the wall.

Internal traffic

Gondola Lift

Funicular
Badaling Great Wall Funicular starts from the opposite of Zhan Tianyou Memorial Hall and goes to the fourth floor of the best viewing point of Badaling Great Wall-South.

Alpine Coaster

Shuttle bus

References

External links 

 
 Badaling Section of the Great Wall at Wikivoyage.org

Buildings and structures in Beijing
Great Wall of China
Tourist attractions in Beijing
AAAAA-rated tourist attractions
Major National Historical and Cultural Sites in Beijing
Landforms of Beijing
Yanqing District